"Die Young" is a 2012 single by Kesha.

Die Young may also refer to:

 Die Young (album), a 2005 album by Wisdom in Chains
 "Die Young" (Black Sabbath song), 1980
 "Die Young" (Roddy Ricch song), 2018 
 "Die Young" (Sheppard song), 2019
 "Die Young" (Sleepy Hallow song), 2022

See also
 Died Young Stayed Pretty, a 2008 documentary film
 "Die Young, Stay Pretty", a song by Blondie from Eat to the Beat